In chemistry, a bicyclic molecule is a molecule that features two joined rings. Bicyclic structures occur widely, for example in many biologically important molecules like α-thujene and camphor. A bicyclic compound can be carbocyclic (all of the ring atoms are carbons), or heterocyclic (the rings' atoms consist of at least two elements), like DABCO. Moreover, the two rings can both be aliphatic (e.g. decalin and norbornane), or can be aromatic (e.g. naphthalene), or a combination of aliphatic and aromatic (e.g. tetralin).

Three modes of ring junction are possible for a bicyclic compound:
 In spirocyclic compounds, the two rings share only one single atom, the spiro atom, which is usually a quaternary carbon. An example of a spirocyclic compound is the photochromic switch spiropyran. 
 In fused/condensed bicyclic compounds, two rings share two adjacent atoms. In other words, the rings share one covalent bond, i.e. the so-called bridgehead atoms are directly connected (e.g. α-thujene  and decalin).
 In bridged bicyclic compounds, the two rings share three or more atoms, separating the two bridgehead atoms by a bridge containing at least one atom. For example, norbornane, also known as bicyclo[2.2.1]heptane, can be viewed as a pair of cyclopentane rings each sharing three of their five carbon atoms. Camphor is a more elaborate example.

Nomenclature
Bicyclic molecules are described by IUPAC nomenclature. The root of the compound name depends on the total number of atoms in all rings together, possibly followed by a suffix denoting the functional group with the highest priority. Numbering of the carbon chain always begins at one bridgehead atom (where the rings meet) and follows the carbon chain along the longest path, to the next bridgehead atom. Then numbering is continued along the second longest path and so on. Fused and bridged bicyclic compounds get the prefix bicyclo, whereas spirocyclic compounds get the prefix spiro. In between the prefix and the suffix, a pair of brackets with numerals denotes the number of carbon atoms between each of the bridgehead atoms. These numbers are arranged in descending order and are separated by periods.
For example, the carbon frame of norbornane contains a total of 7 atoms, hence the root name heptane. This molecule has two paths of 2 carbon atoms and a third path of 1 carbon atom between the two bridgehead carbons, so the brackets are filled in descending order: [2.2.1]. Addition of the prefix bicyclo gives the total name bicyclo[2.2.1]heptane.

The carbon frame of camphor also counts 7 atoms, but is substituted with a carbonyl in this case, hence the suffix heptanone. We start with numbering the carbon frame at the bridgehead atom with the highest priority (methyl goes before proton), hence the bridgehead carbon in front gets number 1, the carbonyl gets number 2 and numbering continues along the carbon chain following the longest path, until the doubly substituted top carbon (number 7). Equal to norbornane, this molecule also has two paths of 2 carbon atoms and one path of 1 carbon atom between the two bridgehead carbons, so the numbers within the brackets stay [2.2.1]. Combining the brackets and suffix (now filling in the position of the carbonyl as well) gives us [2.2.1]heptan-2-one. Besides bicyclo, the prefix should also specify the positions of all methyl substituents so the complete, official name becomes 1,7,7-trimethylbicyclo[2.2.1]heptan-2-one.

When naming simple fused bicyclic compounds, the same method as for bridged bicyclic compounds is applied, except the third path between the two bridgehead atoms now consists of zero atoms. Therefore, fused bicyclic compounds have a "0" included in the brackets. For example, decalin is named bicyclo[4.4.0]decane.  The numbers are sometimes omitted in unambiguous cases.  For example, bicyclo[1.1.0]butane is typically called simply bicyclobutane.

The heterocyclic molecule DABCO has a total of 8 atoms in its bridged structure, hence the root name octane. Here the two bridgehead atoms are nitrogen instead of carbon atoms. Therefore, the official name gets the additional prefix 1,4-diaza and the total name becomes 1,4-diazabicyclo[2.2.2]octane.

References

See also
Polycyclic compound
Bredt's rule

Molecular geometry